Le Nouvelliste is a Swiss French-language daily newspaper, published in Sion, Valais, by the publishing company Éditions Le Nouvelliste SA.

A regional newspaper for the Valais canton, it was established in 1903 in Saint-Maurice by Charles Haegler. At first, it was published three times a week, then became a daily newspaper in 1929.

See also
 List of newspapers in Switzerland

References

External links
  Official website

1903 establishments in Switzerland
Daily newspapers published in Switzerland
French-language newspapers published in Switzerland
Publications established in 1903
Mass media in Sion, Switzerland